Powerball is a multi-state lottery game in the United States. 

Powerball may also refer to:

Lotteries
 The Lottery Office, official reseller of US Powerball in Australia
 Powerball (Australia), a lottery operated in Australia
 The Powerball game of Lotto New Zealand
 The PowerBall game in the South African National Lottery

Arts, entertainment, and media
 Powerball (video game), a game for the Sega Genesis
 Powerball, an event on the sports competition show American Gladiators
 Powerball, a mode in the strategy shooting game GunBound
 Powerballin', a 2004 Chingy album

Other uses
 Powerball, a brand of gyroscopic exercise tool
 Powerballing, alternate name for the drug speedball